V. Martyn Housden is reader in modern history at the University of Bradford. Housden's research interests relate to the history of refugees, Fridtjof Nansen, the League of Nations, the psychoanalysis of Erich Fromm, the history of national minorities, and the history of Germany.

Selected publications
The League of Nations and the Organisation of Peace. London: Longman, 2012. (Seminar Studies in History)
Forgotten Pages in Baltic History. Diversity and Inclusion. Amsterdam: Rodopi, 2011. Edited with David Smith.
Neighbours or Enemies?  Germans, the Baltic and Beyond. Amsterdam: Rodopi, 2008. (With John Hiden)
The Holocaust.  Events, Motives and Legacy. Tirril: Humanities-Ebooks. 2007.
Hans Frank.  Lebensraum and the Holocaust. Basingstoke: Palgrave, 2003. 
Adolf Hitler.: Study of a Revolutionary? London: Routledge, 2000.
Resistance and Conformity in the Third Reich. London: Routledge, 1997. Reprinted 2003.
Helmut Nicolai and Nazi Ideology. London: Macmillan, 1992.

References 

British historians
Living people
Year of birth missing (living people)
Academics of the University of Bradford